Bulbostylis turbinata is a flowering plant in the sedge family, Cyperaceae that is native to Western Australia.

It blooms between February to April producing brown flowers.

It is found in rock-holes and along creeks and rivers and on low-lying flats throughout a large area of the Pilbara, Mid West and Goldfields-Esperance regions where it grows in sandy-loamy-clay soils.

References

turbinata
Plants described in 1941
Angiosperms of Western Australia